Matochkin Strait or Matochkin Shar is a  strait, structurally a fjord, between the Severny and Yuzhny Islands of Novaya Zemlya. It connects the Barents Sea and the Kara Sea.

Geography
The Matochkin Strait is one of the largest fjords in the world.
The banks along the strait are high and steep.
. The strait is covered with ice for the most of the year. There are abandoned fishing settlements along the strait (Matochkin Shar, Stolbovoy).

History
The Tsar Bomba was detonated on October 1961 in the vicinity of Matochkin Strait in 1961, over the Novaya Zemlya archipelago.

It is also the site where, from 1963 to 1990, about 39 underground nuclear tests took place in a vast array of tunnels and shafts under Mount Lazarev and other massifs. After 2000, Russia started to reactivate the test site by enlarging old tunnels and starting construction work. Each summer since then various subcritical hydronuclear experiments have taken place.

See also
List of fjords of Russia

References

Fjords of Russia
Bodies of water of the Barents Sea
Bodies of water of the Kara Sea
Bodies of water of Arkhangelsk Oblast
Novaya Zemlya
Straits of the Arctic Ocean
Russian nuclear test sites